

Gerhard Matzky (19 March 1894 – 9 June 1983) was a German general during World War II who commanded several corps. He was a recipient of the Knight's Cross of the Iron Cross of Nazi Germany. Matzky joined the Bundeswehr in 1956 and served until 1960.

Awards and decorations

 Knight's Cross of the Iron Cross on 5 April 1944 as Generalleutnant and commander of 21. Infanterie-Division
 Grand Merit Cross with Star of the Federal Republic of Germany (April 1967); previously Cross of Merit (1960)

References

Citations

Bibliography

 

1894 births
1983 deaths
People from the Province of Brandenburg
People from Kostrzyn nad Odrą
Bundeswehr generals
German Army generals of World War II
Generals of Infantry (Wehrmacht)
German Army personnel of World War I
Prussian Army personnel
Recipients of the clasp to the Iron Cross, 1st class
Recipients of the Knight's Cross of the Iron Cross
Knights Commander of the Order of Merit of the Federal Republic of Germany
German prisoners of war in World War II held by the United Kingdom
Lieutenant generals of the German Army